Mandan High School is a public high school located in Mandan, North Dakota. It is the only high school within the Mandan Public Schools system, serving grades 9–12. In 2007 the Mandan Public School District renovated the high school. Mandan is the sixth-largest school district in the state of North Dakota. Mandan High School has an 88% graduation rate. Enrollment for the 2009–2010 school year was 1,056 students. The graduating class for the 2009–10 school year was 229 students. On April 1, 2010, Mandan High School was recognized for maintaining 100 years of continuous accreditation from the North Central Association Commission on Accreditation and School Improvement (NCA CASI).

The school district, and therefore the high school, serves Mandan and Harmon. It takes high school students from the Sweet Briar School District.

Academics

Progress reports
The Mandan Public School calendar is divided into four 9-week quarters. Report cards are distributed at parent-teacher conferences or the week after the grading period ends.

Test scores
Mandan students score higher on the ACT than at the state and national levels. Mandan Public School students also score higher on the North Dakota State Assessment than students across the state.

 ACT scores
Below are the most recent ACT results for Mandan High School, North Dakota and the USA.
{| class="wikitable"
|-
! School !! Score
|-
| Mandan High School student average || 16.0
|-
| North Dakota high school student average || 21.6
|-
| USA high school student average || 21.1
|}

 ND State Assessment scores
Below are the most recent North Dakota State Assessment results comparing North Dakota statewide results and Mandan High School results for the 11th grade.
Reading Assessment scores
{| class="wikitable"
|-
! Year !! North Dakota !! Mandan
|-
| 2006 || 72 || 70
|-
| 2007 || 65 || 73
|-
| 2008 || 68 || 74
|-
| 2009 || 63 || 72
|}
Math Assessment Scores
{| class="wikitable"
|-
! Year !! North Dakota !! Mandan
|-
| 2006 || 57 || 57
|-
| 2007 || 55 || 55
|-
| 2008 || 56 || 59
|-
| 2009 || 55 || 63
|}
Science Assessment Scores
{| class="wikitable"
|-
! Year !! North Dakota !! Mandan
|-
| 2006 || 62 || 67
|-
| 2007 || 59 || 60
|-
| 2008 || 61 || 69
|-
| 2009 || 59 || 69
|}

Athletics

Team information
The official school/team colors are black and white, although red has been adopted by some as an alternate or accent color. All of the athletic teams are named the Mandan Braves. Currently, the logo associated with the Braves is a side profile view headshot of a Native American wearing a headdress.

Championships
State Class 'A' Boys' Cross Country: 1981, 1982, 1983
State Class 'A' Boys' Basketball: 1940, 1966, 1967, 1981, 2009
State Class 'A' Girls' Basketball: 1995, 1999, 2000, 2003, 2004, 2005, 2006, 2007, 2008 

State Class 'A' Football: 1939, 1942, 1947, 1948
State Class 'A' Wrestling: 1977
State Class 'A' Boys' Track and Field: 1984 co-champions
State Class Girls' Track and Field: 1970
State Class 'A' Girls' Track and Field: 1985, 2002
State Class 'A' Baseball: 1994, 2010, 2015
State Class 'A' Boys' Swimming and Diving:1995, 1997, 1998
State Class 'A' Girls' Swimming and Diving: 1989, 1990, 1991, 1992, 1999, 2000, 2001, 2002
State Class 'A' Speech: 2005, 2007, 2008, 2009, 2010

National championships
Mandan High School was awarded the 1983 National Cross Country Championship through the XC Legacy series published through Milesplit.us in an effort to begin filling in the national rankings from 1980–1988. The Harrier magazine, operated by Marc Bloom formerly of Runners World magazine, began keeping official rankings in 1989. On 1983: "Culminating a remarkable season Mandan capped  21st consecutive meet win streak with a State Championship".

See also 
 Old Mandan High School: original building on the National Register of Historic Places

References

External links
 Mandan High School

Public high schools in North Dakota
Mandan, North Dakota
North Dakota High School Activities Association (Class A)
North Dakota High School Activities Association (Class AAA Football)
Schools in Morton County, North Dakota